Fort Davis is a Civil War earthwork that was constructed for the defense of Washington. It is located in the Fort Davis (Washington, D.C.) neighborhood.

History
The fort, built to serve as an outer defense of the City of Washington, was named in honor of Benjamin F. Davis, killed at the Battle of Brandy Station.

It was a small hexagonal fort with perimeter of 220 yards, and places for 11 guns. It was 300 feet above mean tide of the Potomac River.

After the war, Daniel Lee's damage claim was denied.

References

Civil War defenses of Washington, D.C.
National Park Service areas in Washington, D.C.
Parks in Washington, D.C.
Forts on the National Register of Historic Places in Washington, D.C.
American Civil War on the National Register of Historic Places